Alain Dorval (born Alain Bergé born April 17, 1946) is a French voice actor born in Algiers. He is best known as the official dub-over artist of Sylvester Stallone, Nick Nolte, and the Disney character Pete. His voice can also be heard on the radio stations Skyrock and ADO.

Roles

Television animation
Goof Troop (Pete)
Once Upon a Time... Life (Le Gros, Le Teigneux)
Once Upon a Time... Space (Commander Le Gros, Le Teigneux)
Superman: The Animated Series (Lex Luthor)
Quarxs by Maurice Benayoun (1991-1993)

Original video animationAladdin and the King of Thieves (Sa'luk)An Extremely Goofy Movie (Pete)Mickey, Donald, Goofy: The Three Musketeers (Captain Pete)

Theatrical animationAn American Tail (Tiger)An American Tail: Fievel Goes West (Tiger)A Goofy Movie (Pete)Antz (Weaver)Mickey's Christmas Carol (Ghost of Christmas Yet to Come)The Secret Life of Pets 2 (Rooster)

Video gamesCrash Nitro Kart Tiny TigerJak II (Krew, Brutter)Jak X: Combat Racing (Krew)

Live action48 Hrs. (Jack Cates)Alien (Brett)Baa Baa Black Sheep (Andy Micklin)Cape Fear (Sam Bowden)Cobra (Marion Cobretti)Daylight (Kit Latura)First Blood (John Rambo)Hulk (David Banner)Jesus of Nazareth (John the Baptist)Rambo (John Rambo)Rocky IV (Rocky Balboa)Rocky Balboa (Rocky Balboa)Stop! Or My Mom Will Shoot (Sergeant Joseph Andrew 'Joe' Bomowski)Transformers (Ratchet)Tron'' (Kevin Flynn, Clu)

External links
Internet Movie Database
Biography on Stallone.biz

1946 births
French male voice actors
Living people
Pieds-Noirs
People from Algiers
French National Academy of Dramatic Arts alumni